Lytocrioceras is a genus of ancyloceratine ammonites from the Lower Cretaceous with a shell that resembles a safety pin. The shell begins as a loosely wound spiral, followed by a straight shaft which makes a U-turn to go back is somewhat the opposite direction, ending in a jog, offset from the original coil.

Lytocrioceras was originally included in the Ancyloceratidae (Lytoceratina), united with other similar forms but has since been reassigned to the Macroscaphitidae.

References

Ancyloceratoidea
Ammonitida genera
Cretaceous ammonites
Ammonites of Asia
Barremian life